Calf 269 is a bull who was rescued as a calf by anonymous activists, days before his planned slaughter.  He was born at an Israeli facility in the vicinity of Azor, a town on the outskirts of Tel Aviv. The slaughter was scheduled for June 2013. He is described as sweet-tempered and white-headed, and his ear carried a tag numbered 269, indicating he was destined for slaughter. The Israeli protests regarding the calf were followed by protests in the U.K. and other places across the world. The protests aimed at conveying that animal parts eaten as food by humans once belonged to a living individual, who lived a tortured life and faced a brutal death, after which his or her carcass was processed into human food.  The significance of the event led to the creation of "269 life"(:fr:269 Life France), an animal liberation movement founded in October 2012.

Israeli protests
On the occasion of World Farm Animals Day, (Gandhi's birthday) 2 October 2012, two Israelis, Zohar Gorelik and Sasha Boojor, and one Russian activist, Oleg Ozerov, had the number 269 branded on their skin with a hot-iron branding tool. Haaretz reports that this branding was an act of fellowship with Calf 269. The branding incident took place at Tel Aviv's Rabin square. The action is considered an attempt to bring to light the mistreatment of animals in the farming sector. According to Haaretz the treatment of animals would require terminologies applied to the Holocaust in order to adequately describe the situation. According to Netta Ahituv writing in the Haaretz, the calf's story has inspired a worldwide tattoo movement. At least a thousand individuals have had themselves branded or tattooed with the number 269. In a testimony a tattooed individual who was a tow truck driver narrated that the tattoo reminded one passenger of his grandmother's stories of  German concentration camps. The website 269life.com was created by Boojor following this protest. The protests were an attempt to end the anonymity of millions of animals butchered for human consumption. The website declares, "This anonymous male calf will be forever immortalized on our bodies, and hopefully this message of solidarity will somehow bring a new way of looking at non-human animals."

Protests in the United Kingdom
In the U.K., campaigners, motivated by this action of the Israelis, decided to brand themselves on their chest with the number 269.  This took place in front of a Kentucky Fried Chicken outlet in Leeds a day before their scheduled protest at the Leeds city centre. One protester was jailed, the police allegedly took away cameras and erased memory cards. A protester who was interviewed justified the protest as a reaction to the extreme cruelty perpetrated by the dairy industry such as shooting calves at birth.  Protests in London were organised by Becky Folkard. Folkard said that although the protest might be considered extreme, other methods such as fastening oneself to railings and stopping horses by standing in their way were used by women to force authorities to give them a right to vote. PETA's spokesperson in a statement of support pointed that the suffering endured by non-human animals such as cows, chickens, or pigs when they are branded, have their testicles, beaks or horns cut, is no less than that of humans in a similar situation. Folkard's planned protests have been described as a disturbing community agitation opposing barbarity inflicted on industrial dairy animals.

On September 26, 2015 another hot-iron branding was held in Birmingham.

Response from animal farmers
Joseph Keating, life-stock adviser of the National Farmers Union is quoted in a Guardian story as expressing surprise in response to the English protests. According to Keating, branding of animals has been banned in England for many years.

See also
 Dairy farming
 Human branding
 Jewish vegetarianism
 List of animal rights groups

References

External links  

 Israel Story podcast episode about the 269 movement

Individual bulls
Animal rights protests
Cruelty to animals
Individual animals in Israel
Animal welfare organizations based in Israel